Alive is a 1993 American biographical survival drama film based on Piers Paul Read's 1974 book Alive: The Story of the Andes Survivors, which details a Uruguayan rugby team's crash aboard Uruguayan Air Force Flight 571 into the Andes mountains on October 13, 1972.

Filmed in the Purcell Mountains in British Columbia, the film was directed by Frank Marshall, written by John Patrick Shanley, and narrated by John Malkovich. It features an ensemble cast including Ethan Hawke, Josh Hamilton, Vincent Spano, Bruce Ramsay, John Haymes Newton, Illeana Douglas, and Danny Nucci. One of the survivors, Nando Parrado (portrayed by Hawke in the film), served as the technical advisor for the film.

Plot 
The film opens with a group of photographs of the Stella Maris College's Old Christians Rugby Team. Carlitos Páez points out several members of the team and reflects on the accident in a brief monologue.

Uruguayan Air Force Flight 571 flies over the Andes on October 13, 1972. The raucous rugby players and a few of their relatives and friends are eagerly looking forward to an upcoming match in Chile.

Upon emerging from clouds, the plane encounters turbulence and collides with a mountain. The wings and tail are separated from the fuselage, which slides down a mountain slope before coming to a stop. Six passengers and one flight attendant are ejected from the plane and die. Antonio, the team captain, coordinates efforts to help the injured. Roberto Canessa and Gustavo Zerbino, both medical students, aid the injured. Another six passengers soon die, including both pilots and Nando's mother, Eugenia. Nando, who sustained a head injury, falls into a coma, and his sister Susana has suffered harsh internal injuries.

As the sun sets, the survivors make preparations for the night. Canessa discovers that the seat covers can be unzipped and used as blankets. The survivors go inside the fuselage and curl up beside one another to stay warm. Antonio, Roy Harley, and Rafael Cano plug the gaping hole at the end of the fuselage with luggage to keep out the wind. Two passengers die overnight. With nothing to hunt or gather on the mountain, Antonio declares they will use rationing when the survivors find a tin of chocolates and a case of wine. After seeing a plane fly past, they think it dipped its wings, and the survivors celebrate. Expecting to be rescued the next day, everyone except Javier, his wife Liliana, and Antonio eat the remaining chocolates. This causes a quarrel among Antonio and several others.

Nando regains consciousness. After learning of his mother's death, Nando watches over Susana vigilantly. Knowing she will die of her injuries within a few days, he vows to set off on foot and find a way out of the mountains. When Carlitos reminds him that he will need food, Nando suggests eating the flesh of the deceased pilots to give him the strength to survive the journey to find help. Susana dies from her injuries. The survivors listen to a radio for word of their rescue but are devastated to hear the search called off after nine days.

After great debate, the starving passengers decide to eat the flesh of their dead relatives and friends. Zerbino, Rafael, and Juan Martino set off to search for the tail of the plane in hopes of finding batteries for the plane's radio to transmit their location. Among pieces of the wreckage, the teammates find additional corpses, but return to the group with news that the tail of the plane is likely a little farther away. Later in the week, an avalanche strikes the plane and fills much of the interior with snow. Eight of the survivors, including Antonio and Liliana, are smothered to death by the snow. The remaining 19 survivors are forced to stay inside the plane when they realize there is a blizzard outside.

A second team, made up of Nando, Canessa, and Antonio "Tintin" Vizintin, sets out and find the tail of the plane. Unable to bring the batteries to the fuselage, they return to the fuselage to get Roy, who is thought to have experience with electrical equipment. They bring him to the tail of the plane to see if he could fix the radio. When Roy is unsuccessful, the team decides to return to the fuselage.

Federico and Alberto die from their injuries, as does Rafael, leading Nando to convince a reluctant Canessa to search for a way out of the mountains, taking Tintin with them. Two days into the journey, they send Tintin back to the fuselage so they can appropriate his rations and continue on their own. After a 12-day trek, the two escape the mountains and alert the authorities to their companions' location. Two helicopters, one of which have Nando and Canessa onboard, appear overhead of the survivors on the mountain, leading the remaining 14 survivors to celebrate their impending rescue.

In the present, Carlitos describes how the survivors later returned to the site of the crash and buried the corpses under a pile of stones, marked with a cross. The memorial to the 29 deceased and 16 survivors is shown.

Cast 
The film opens with a monologue by an older Carlitos Paez played by John Malkovich (uncredited). The names of the people who died in the disaster were changed for the film. There were three key exceptions: Eugenia and Susana Parrado (Nando Parrado's mother and sister, respectively), and Liliana Methol (Javier Methol's wife).

Survivors

Deceased

Reception 
Rotten Tomatoes, a review aggregator, reports that 59% of 27 surveyed critics gave the film a positive review; the average rating is 6.17/10.

David Ansen of Newsweek said that, while, "Piers Paul Read's acclaimed book ... paid special attention to the social structure that evolved among the group ... Marshall ... downplays the fascinating sociological details—and the ambiguities of character—in favor of action, heroism and a vague religiosity that's sprinkled over the story like powdered sugar."

Others, such as Ray Green, praised the tactful nature of the film stating that, "despite the potential for lurid sensationalism, Marshall manages to keep his and the film's dignity by steering an effectively downbeat course through some grim goings on thanks in no small manner to the almost allegorical ring of Shanley's stylized dialogue."  Green continues by describing the film as, "thrilling and engrossing as it is at times, Alive is more than an action film—in its own way it is also a drama of ideas, and of the human spirit as well."

Roger Ebert gave the film a mixed two-and-a-half stars out of a possible four. He praised the "first-rate cast" and cinematography. Yet he wrote: "There are some stories you simply can't tell. The story of the Andes survivors may be one of them [due to the] sheer enormity of the experience." He also questioned the realism of how normal the actors' bodies looked after portraying two months of near-starvation.

The film grossed $36.7 million in the United States and Canada and $45.8 million internationally for a worldwide total of $82.5 million.

Documentary 
A companion documentary, Alive: 20 Years Later, was released at the same time as the film. It includes interviews with the survivors, as well as documentary footage of the rescue. The 30th Anniversary Edition of Alive: The Miracle of the Andes (on DVD) includes this documentary in the Extras section.

Related media 
 I Am Alive: Surviving the Andes Plane Crash
 Miracle in the Andes
 Stranded: I've Come from a Plane that Crashed in the Mountains
 Survive! (film)

See also 
 Survival film, about the film genre, with a list of related films

References

External links 

 
 
 
 

Uruguayan Air Force Flight 571
1993 films
1990s disaster films
1990s biographical drama films
American disaster films
American biographical drama films
American survival films
Disaster films based on actual events
American docudrama films
Drama films based on actual events
1990s English-language films
Films scored by James Newton Howard
Films about aviation accidents or incidents
Films about death
Films based on non-fiction books
Films directed by Frank Marshall
Films produced by Kathleen Kennedy
Films set in 1972
Films set in Chile
Mountaineering films
Paramount Pictures films
Rugby union films
Films with screenplays by John Patrick Shanley
The Kennedy/Marshall Company films
Touchstone Pictures films
Films about cannibalism
Cultural depictions of Uruguayan men
Cultural depictions of rugby footballers
1993 drama films
Avalanches in film
Films shot in British Columbia
1990s American films